Miriam Adelson (born 10 October 1945) is an Israeli American physician and billionaire. After her marriage to  American business magnate Sheldon Adelson in 1991, she became a donor to conservative political causes in the United States and Israel. The Adelsons donated to the Donald Trump 2016 presidential campaign, his presidential inauguration, his defense fund against the Mueller investigation into Russian interference and the 2020 campaign.

She is the current publisher of the newspaper Israel Hayom. She is also a voting member on the board of trustees at the University of Southern California.

Miriam and Sheldon Adelson were presented with the Woodrow Wilson Award for Corporate Citizenship by the Woodrow Wilson International Center for Scholars of the Smithsonian Institution in 2008. In 2013, she received honorary citizenship of Jerusalem. She was awarded the Presidential Medal of Freedom by Donald Trump in 2018.

As of June 2021, Adelson is the 44th-richest person, fifth-richest woman, and richest Israeli in the world, with an estimated net worth of US$29.6 billion according to Bloomberg Billionaires Index through her majority ownership of Las Vegas Sands.

Biography
Miriam Farbstein (later Adelson) was born in Tel Aviv, Mandatory Palestine in 1945, to parents who fled Poland before the Holocaust. Her father was a prominent member of the Mapam political party. In the 1950s, her family settled in Haifa, where Adelson's father owned and operated several movie theaters. 

She attended the Hebrew Reali School for 12 years. She served mandatory army service as a medical officer at Ness Ziona. After earning a Bachelor of Science in Microbiology and Genetics from the Hebrew University of Jerusalem, she earned a medical degree from Tel Aviv University's Sackler Medical School.

She married Ariel Ochshorn, also a physician, with whom she had two children. Adelson divorced Ochshorn in the 1980s, and while studying at Rockefeller University, she met Sheldon Adelson, whom she married in 1991. She is credited with influencing Sheldon's political views on Israel and served as one of the 'finance vice-chairs' for the inauguration of Donald Trump. After Sheldon Adelson died in 2021, she became the owner of casino company Las Vegas Sands and is now on Forbes' 36th position for the ranking of The Richest People in The World. Her net worth is $38.2B in 2022.

Medical career
She became a physician and eventually the chief internist in an emergency room at Tel Aviv's Rokach (Hadassah) Hospital.

After divorcing her first husband, she went to Rockefeller University in 1986 as an associate physician specializing in drug addiction. She was mentored by and collaborated with Mary Jeanne Kreek.

In 1993, she founded a substance abuse center and research clinic. In 2000, she and her second husband opened the Dr. Miriam and Sheldon G. Adelson Research Clinic in Las Vegas. A strong supporter of Israel, she admitted her heart has always been in that country and that she got "stuck" in America after meeting her husband.

Support for Donald Trump
Adelson is known for her support for Donald Trump. She and her husband were the largest donors of Trump throughout his presidency; they provided the largest donation to his 2016 campaign, his presidential inauguration, his defense fund against the Mueller investigation into Russian interference and the 2020 campaign.

She has written that Trump "should enjoy sweeping support" among U.S. Jews and Israelis, and that Trump deserves a "Book of Trump" in the Bible due to his support for Israel. She pushed for the pardon of Aviem Sella who spied against America. 
Adelson wrote that Trump represents "kinship, friendship, courage, the triumph of truth" and that "Israelis and proud Jews owe Donald Trump our gratitude."

Awards and recognition
  Presidential Medal of Freedom, awarded by President Donald Trump (2018)
 Doctor Honoris Causa by Tel Aviv University (2007)

References

Further reading
 

1945 births
Living people
Adelson family
American people of Polish-Jewish descent
Israeli emigrants to the United States
Israeli billionaires
American billionaires
Female billionaires
People from Tel Aviv
Physicians from Haifa
Hebrew University of Jerusalem alumni
Tel Aviv University alumni
Rockefeller University alumni
American women philanthropists
Israeli women physicians
Israeli emergency physicians
20th-century American physicians
21st-century American physicians
Israeli people of Polish-Jewish descent
Presidential Medal of Freedom recipients
20th-century American women physicians
21st-century American women physicians
Jewish American philanthropists
Nevada Republicans
American Zionists
Jewish physicians
Sheldon Adelson